Breast carcinoma-amplified sequence 1 is a protein that in humans is encoded by the BCAS1 gene.

Breast carcinoma amplified sequence 1 (BCAS1) was isolated from a region at 20q13 which is amplified in a variety of tumor types and associated with more aggressive tumor phenotypes. Among the genes identified from this region, BCAS1 was found to be highly expressed in three amplified breast cancer cell lines and in one breast tumor without amplification at 20q13.2. However, the BCAS1 gene is not in the common region of maximal amplification and its expression was not detected in the breast cancer cell line MCF7, in which this region is highly amplified. Although not consistently expressed, BCAS1 is a candidate oncogene. It is predicted to encode a protein of 584 amino acids with no significant homology to other proteins.

References

External links

Further reading